Accidental President or The Accidental President may also refer to:

 John Tyler, 10th President of the United States, who assumed the office after the death of William Henry Harrison, the 9th President
 Millard Fillmore, 13th President of the United States, who assumed the office after the death of Zachary Taylor, the 12th President
 Andrew Johnson, 17th President of the United States, who assumed the office after the assassination of Abraham Lincoln, the 16th President
 Chester A Arthur, 21st President of the United States, who assumed the office after the assassination of  James Garfield, the 20th President
 Theodore Roosevelt, 26th President of the United States, who assumed the office after the assassination of William McKinley, the 25th President.
 Calvin Coolidge, 30th President of the United States, who assumed the office after the death of Warren G. Harding, the 29th President 
 Harry S Truman, 33rd President of the United States, who assumed the office after the death of Franklin D. Roosevelt, the 32nd President
 Lyndon B. Johnson, 36th President of the United States, who assumed the office after the assassination of John F. Kennedy, the 35th President 
 Gerald Ford, 38th President of the United States, who assumed the office after Richard Nixon's resignation

 The Accidental President, a 2001 book by David A. Kaplan about the United States 2000 presidential election